New Country Star, LLC (abbreviated NCS) pioneered the dawn of e-zines (web magazines) in June 2004, breaking ground, publishing audio interviews with stars such as George Jones,
Pam Tillis, and Blake Shelton. New Country Star was one of the first entertainment sites to conduct online monthly polls of readers, drawing some 40,000 hits per day at their height.
Today they are known for giving music fans the inside track behind the music of all genres with in depth articles and breaking news. New Country Star's founder and CEO, Sara Jo Anthony, has been an advocate and voice for the independent musician.
   The corporation has stated that the publication New Country Star is currently on hiatus, disabling the website in early June, 2015.

Canadian branch 

Although New Country Star operates out of the U.S. it formerly hosted a sister publication, Canadian Country Star, that was managed in Alberta, Canada.

Online magazines published in the United States
Magazines established in 2004